Ruslan Savchenko (Руслан Савченко, born ) is a Ukrainian male weightlifter, competing in the 76 kg category and representing Ukraine at international competitions. He participated at the 2000 Summer Olympics in the 77 kg event. He competed at world championships, most recently at the 1997 World Weightlifting Championships.

He set two middleweight world records in November 1993 at the world championships, in the snatch and total (snatch + clean & jerk). The snatch world record of 170.0 kg has never been broken and after 1997 this weightclass was discontinued.

Major results
 - 1993 World Championships Middleweight class (370.0 kg)
 - 1994 World Championships Middleweight class (360.0 kg)
 - 1994 European Championships Middleweight class (355.0 kg)
 - 1997 European Championships Middleweight class (350.0 kg)

References

External links
 

1971 births
Living people
Ukrainian male weightlifters
Weightlifters at the 2000 Summer Olympics
Olympic weightlifters of Ukraine
Place of birth missing (living people)
World Weightlifting Championships medalists
World record setters in weightlifting
World record holders in Olympic weightlifting
20th-century Ukrainian people
21st-century Ukrainian people